Rise Records ( Rise Italy) is an Italian record label of house music and Italo dance, owned by Time Group and founded by Giacomo Maiolini. in 1998. Rise label rose as department of Time Records, after the death of Downtown.

History
Rise Records - which belongs to Time Group - was entrusted to the A&R Alex Gaudino, who thanks to his intuition and his hard work obtains quickly a great credibility among the music operators.

Rise Records artists
Alex Gaudino
Black Legend
Christian Cheval
Daniele Tignino
Electroluv
James Kakande
Jason Rooney
Laurent Wolf (only in Italy)
Mario Fargetta
Mousse T (only in Italy)

External links

House music record labels
Italian record labels
Record labels established in 1998
Trance record labels